The 1945–46 Santosh Trophy was the 3rd edition of the Santosh Trophy, the main State competition for football in India. It was held in Bombay. Bengal defeated Bombay 2-0 in the final.

Fred Pugsley, an Anglo-Burmese footballer who had moved to India temporarily, scored seven goals in Bengal's win over Rajputana. This is a record in Santosh Trophy that was later equalled by Inder Singh in 1974-75 Jalandhar nationals.

Western India Football Association (WIFA) renamed itself as Bombay just before the tournament.

Matches

Bombay led 2-0 at half time

Bengal led by five goals at half-time. The tournament schedule was adjusted because Bengal arrived a day late. 

Moin of Hyderabad was sent off 13 minutes from the end.

Semifinal

Bombay led 2-0 at half time.

Final 

Bengal scored their goals in the 5th minute of both halves. Das scored from a cross by Pugsley. Nandy was assisted by S. Ghosh in the second goal. The trophy was presented by Justice Kama.

Squads
 Bengal : Ismail; S Das and Taj Mohammed; D. Chandra, T. Aao and Mahabir Prasad; Rabi Das, Apparao, Pugsley, S. Ghosh and S. Nandy (captain)
 Bombay : Sanjiva; D.M. Mandon (captain) and Papen; Arnold, Robinson and Govind; Vandockum, Tipple, Cocklin, McCall and Dhakuram Also : Shetty
 Delhi : Osman; S.M. Bhukari and Rahmat; Bashir, Afzal and S. A. Hashmi; Yusuf, Roshan Ali, Buland Akhtar, Atma Ram and M.P. Khan. Also : Mahmud (defender), Hasan (mid), Habib, Rabbani, M. Faiyaz (forwards)
 Dacca : G Burton; D. Dutta and Saheball; H Mitra, S Guha and R Sen; S Bose, A Roy, P Mukerjee, A Rachia and A Das
 Hyderabad : Eeriah; Sher Khan and Fruvall; Hadi, Jamal and Noor; S Susay, A Susay, Shamsher, Azeem and Mahmood. Also Moin
 N.W.I.F.A : Yacoob; Ibrar Hussain and Saeed; Yoya Jan, Golam Mohammad and Arshad; Akbarjan, Gilbert, Rahim, Ataullah and Amjad
 Mysore : Bama; Palladi and Jayram; Baseer, S. Mohiuddin and Sumugan; Borolingam, Karim, Nanjunda, Ahmed and Raman; Also : Shanmugam
 United Provinces : Arthur; Kazim and Rajaram; Wajihul, Aziz and Mahabir; Kullu, Abid, Furhat, Mahmud and Qader 
 Madras : S. Moni; Rammohan Rao and K. Mani; A. D. Parthasarathy, Jaganathan and Murugesan; Arnikandasami, Ganesan, Vishwesara Rao, Hanumantha Rao and Thangaraj

The day after the final, a match was played between All India and Europeans. 

Indian XI : Osman (Delhi); Taj Mohammed, and Papen (Bombay); Shanmugham (Mysore), T. Ao (Bengal) and Mahabir Prasad (Bengal); S. Nandy (Bengal), Apparao (Bengal), Rabi Das (Bengal), Raman (Mysore) and Dhakuram (Bombay)  
Reserves : Ismail (Bengal), S. Das (Bengal), D. Chandra (Bengal), A. Rudra (Dacca) and Thomas (Bombay)

Europeans : Lambert (CMP), Hamilton (Navy) and Tipple (RAF) and Arnold (Navy), Robinson (Embarkation Headquarters (EHQ)) and Airog (Navy); Shanks (RAF), Gallacher (CMP), Cocklin (Navy), McCall (EHQ) and Sutton (CMP)

References 

Santosh Trophy seasons
1945–46 in Indian football